Dr. Pushpa Leela Alban is an Indian politician and incumbent member of the Tamil Nadu Legislative Assembly from the Padmanabapuram constituency. She represents the Dravida Munnetra Kazhagam party.

References 

Members of the Tamil Nadu Legislative Assembly
Dravida Munnetra Kazhagam politicians
Living people
Year of birth missing (living people)